Cameron Murray (born 31 March 1975 in Hawick, Scotland) is a former Scotland international rugby union player.

Rugby Union career

Amateur career

Murray played for Haddington, Hawick Trades and Hawick.

Following his retirement from professional rugby Murray played from Melrose for several seasons. He announced his retirement from playing in April 2012.

Professional career

Murray played professionally for Scottish team Borders between 1996 and 1997 before the team merged with Edinburgh Rugby in 1998. He continued to play for Edinburgh until Borders were revived in 2002. For the teams he played in both the Heineken Cup and Celtic League. He retired from professional rugby in 2004.

International career

Playing mainly at wing he was first selected for Scotland in 1998 against England in a Calcutta Cup match. He played for Scotland in the 1999 Five Nations Championship which Scotland won, and was selected for the team for the 1999 Rugby World Cup. He continued to play for Scotland in both 2000 and 2001 and won a total of 24 Test caps and scored seven tries for 35 points.

Teaching career

Murray works as a P.E. teacher at the Berwickshire High School.

References

Sources

 

1975 births
Living people
Haddington RFC players
Hawick RFC players
Hawick Trades players
Rugby union players from Hawick
Rugby union wings
Scotland international rugby union players
Scottish rugby union players